13th parallel may refer to:

13th parallel north, a circle of latitude in the Northern Hemisphere
13th parallel south, a circle of latitude in the Southern Hemisphere